Massilia is the Latin name of the ancient Greek city Massalia, now Marseille.

Massilia may also refer to:

Massilia (bacterium), a genus of bacteria
Massilia, a 2014 album by Massilia Sound System
Massilians, Gaulish followers of Pelagius
Massilianism, an earlier name of Semi-Pelagianism
, ship of the Compagnie de Navigation Sud-Atlantique

See also
Marseille (disambiguation)
Marsiglia (disambiguation)